Whitefield's Tabernacle is the name of several churches associated with George Whitefield, including:

 Whitefield's Tabernacle, Moorfields, London
 Whitefield's Tabernacle, Tottenham Court Road, London
 Whitefield's Tabernacle, Penn Street, Bristol
 Whitefield's Tabernacle, Kingswood (a town on the eastern edge of Bristol where Whitefield preached to miners)